Operating Systems: Design and Implementation   is a computer science textbook written by Andrew S. Tanenbaum, with help from Albert S. Woodhull. The book describes, in detail, the topic of Operating System Designing, It includes Tanenbaum's MINIX, a free Unix-like operating system designed for teaching purposes. Publisher is Prentice Hall (1987). The source code for MINIX was included as part of the original 719 pages of text. Later versions of the three editions also included loadable disks with MINIX.

See also 
 List of important publications in computer science
 History of Linux
 Tanenbaum–Torvalds debate

References 

1987 non-fiction books
Books on operating systems
Engineering textbooks
MINIX
Prentice Hall books